Prealpino is a station of the Brescia Metro, in the city of Brescia in northern Italy. The underground station is the northern terminus of the line.

Although there was an official ribbon cutting ceremony at the station on 2 February 2013, the line did not become operational until 2 March 2013.

References

Brescia Metro stations
Railway stations opened in 2013
2013 establishments in Italy
Railway stations in Italy opened in the 21st century